On May 20, 1822, Samuel Moore (DR) of  resigned.  A special election was held on October 1, 1822 to fill the resulting vacancy.

Election result

Ingham took his seat on December 2, 1822.

See also
List of special elections to the United States House of Representatives

References

Pennsylvania 1822 06
Pennsylvania 1822 06
1822 06
Pennsylvania 06
United States House of Representatives 06
United States House of Representatives 1822 06